Sacral may refer to:

Sacred, associated with divinity and considered worthy of spiritual respect or devotion
Of the sacrum, a large, triangular bone at the base of the spine

See also